Edward William Dawson (13 February 1904 – 4 June 1979) was an English cricketer who played in five Test matches between 1928 and 1930.

A batsman whose studious technique made use of his talent, Dawson excelled as a schoolboy for Eton College, scoring 159 in the traditional fixture against Harrow. He went up to Magdalene College, Cambridge, and earned his blue as a freshman, captaining the university in 1927.

He played his county cricket for Leicestershire, captaining the county for four seasons. He toured with Marylebone Cricket Club (MCC) to South Africa in 1927–28 and New Zealand in 1929–30.  He made 55 in his last Test, at Auckland, opening the innings with Ted Bowley.  He scored 12,598 first-class runs with 14 centuries, the highest being a knock of 146 against Gloucestershire.  His swansong was a chanceless 91 against the Australians in 1934.

As a member of the Coldstream Guards during World War II, his duties included guarding Rudolf Hess in Sussex. In his later years he was a creative director of the Outward Bound movement.

References

External links

 

1904 births
1979 deaths
People educated at Eton College
Alumni of Magdalene College, Cambridge
England Test cricketers
Cambridge University cricketers
Leicestershire cricketers
Leicestershire cricket captains
English cricketers
Free Foresters cricketers
Marylebone Cricket Club cricketers
North v South cricketers
Gentlemen cricketers
Gentlemen of England cricketers
Sir Julien Cahn's XI cricketers
English cricketers of 1919 to 1945
H. D. G. Leveson Gower's XI cricketers
Lord Hawke's XI cricketers
C. I. Thornton's XI cricketers
Marylebone Cricket Club South African Touring Team cricketers